The following is a list of the top team performances during the National Collegiate Athletic Association (NCAA) Division I college soccer NCAA Division I Men's Soccer Championship as of May 2021 with teams listed by number of championships, second-place finishes, and semifinal finishes. Third place matches were only held between 1974 and 1979.

All schools are listed by their current athletic brand names, which do not always match the names under which they competed in a specific tournament.

Cumulative results

Schools in Italics no longer compete in Division I.

References

External links 
 NCAA Men's Soccer

cumulative